Georgi Petkov may refer to:

 Georgi Petkov (footballer, born 1976), Bulgarian football goalkeeper
 Georgi Petkov (footballer, born 1988), Bulgarian football defender
 Georgi Petkov (rower) (born 1956), Bulgarian Olympic rower